Estonian Chess Federation (abbreviation ECF) is one of the sport governing bodies in Estonia which deals with chess.

The ECF was established in 1931 and re-established in 1990.

The president of the ECF is Ken Koort.

References

External links
 

Sports governing bodies in Estonia
Chess in Estonia